Indre-et-Loire is a department in west-central France named after the Indre River and Loire River. In 2019, it had a population of 610,079. Sometimes referred to as Touraine, the name of the historic region, it nowadays is part of the Centre-Val de Loire region. Its prefecture is Tours and subprefectures are Chinon and Loches. Indre-et-Loire is a touristic destination for its numerous monuments that are part of the Châteaux of the Loire Valley.

History

Early times
Indre-et-Loire is one of the original 83 departments established during the French Revolution on 4 March 1790. It was created from the former province of Touraine and of small portions of Orléanais, Anjou and Poitou. Its prefecture, Tours, was a centre of learning in the Early Middle Ages, having been a key focus of Christian evangelisation since St Martin became its first bishop around 375. From the mid-15th century, the royal court repaired to the Loire Valley, with Tours as its capital; the confluence of the Loire River and Cher River became a centre of silk manufacturing and other luxury goods, including the wine trade, creating a prosperous bourgeoisie.

Recent years
After the creation of the department it remained politically conservative, as Honoré de Balzac recorded in several of his novels. Conservative Tours refused to welcome the railways which instead were obliged to route their lines by way of Saint-Pierre-des-Corps on the city's eastern edge.   The moderate temper of the department's politics remained apparent after the Franco-Prussian War of 1870: sentiments remained predominantly pro-royalist during the early years of the Third Republic. For most of the nineteenth century, Indre-et-Loire was a rural department, but pockets of heavy-duty industrialisation began to appear towards the century's end, accompanied by left-wing politics.   1920 saw the birth of the French Communist Party at the Congress of Tours. By 1920, Saint-Pierre-des-Corps had become a major railway hub and a centre of railway workshops: it had also acquired a reputation as a bastion of working class solidarity.

Geography

Indre-et-Loire is part of the region of Centre-Val de Loire; the neighbouring departments are Loir-et-Cher, Indre, Vienne, Maine-et-Loire and Sarthe. The commune of Descartes is famous as the birthplace of French philosopher and mathematician, René Descartes.

Principal towns

The most populous commune is Tours, the prefecture. As of 2019, there are 10 communes with more than 10,000 inhabitants:

Demographics

Politics

The President of the Departmental Council is Jean-Gérard Paumier of The Republicans.

Current National Assembly Representatives

Tourism

Indre-et-Loire is home to numerous outstanding châteaux that are open to the public, among them are the following:
 Château d'Amboise
 Château d'Azay-le-Rideau
 Château de la Bourdaisière
 Château de Chenonceau 
 Château de Chinon
 Château de la Guerche
 Château de Langeais
 Château de Loches
 Château de Marçay
 Château de Montpoupon
 Château de Plessis-lez-Tours
 Château du Rivau
 Château de Tours
 Château de Villandry
Château du Clos Lucé
Château d'Ussé

See also
Cantons of the Indre-et-Loire department
Communes of the Indre-et-Loire department
Arrondissements of the Indre-et-Loire department

References

External links
  Prefecture website
  Departmental Council website

  
  Official tourist website of Touraine Loire Valley

 
1790 establishments in France
Departments of Centre-Val de Loire
States and territories established in 1790